In the 1933 Battle of Kashgar, Gen. Ma Zhancang signed a secret agreement with the daotai of Kashgar, Ma Shaowu, and his Chinese Muslim troops joined the Han Chinese garrison inside the yamen in Kashgar and helped them repulse Uighur and Kirghiz attacks led by Abdullah Bughra. Turkic Uighur and Kirghiz forces led by the Uighur Timur Beg had been attacking Chinese Muslim villages and pillaging them.  During the fighting Timur Beg was shot and then beheaded by Ma Zhancang's forces, his head being put on display at the Idgah mosque. When more Chinese Muslim troops arrived, they reinforced the Chinese garrison inside Kashgar. Osman Ali, the Kirghiz rebel, attempted to attack the yamen, but was driven back with heavy losses. He then proceeded to loot the city.

On September 26, 1933, the Syrian Arab Tawfiq Bay led a Turkic force against the Chinese Muslims in Kashgar new city. Ma Zhancang repulsed the attack after very heavy fighting, and wounded Tawfiq Bay.

During the battle the Kirghiz prevented the Uighurs from looting the city, mainly because they wanted to loot it themselves. They stole the belongings of, and started murdering, the Chinese's concubines and spouses who were women of Turkic origin and Chinese people themselves.

References

Kashgar 1933
1933 in China
Kashgar 1933
Kashgar